Michael Loebenstein (born 1974 in Vienna) is a writer, curator and as of 1 October 2017 the director of the Austrian Film Museum (Österreichisches Filmmuseum). From October 2011 to January 2017 he held the post of Chief Executive Officer (CEO) of the National Film and Sound Archive of Australia (NFSA). Since 2013 he is serving as Secretary General of FIAF, the International Federation of Film Archives.

Previously he held senior positions at the Austrian Film Museum and at the Ludwig Boltzmann Institute for History and Society (currently operating as the Ludwig Boltzmann Institute for Digital History) in its historical research cluster. He worked as an advisor to the Austrian Federal Ministry for Education, Arts and Culture. He has also worked as a freelance curator and researcher in the field of audiovisual archiving and history, having particular interests in avant-garde and documentary film, Visual History and Holocaust Studies.

As a writer Michael has published books on filmmakers including Peter Tscherkassky, Gustav Deutsch, Maria Lassnig and Ruth Beckermann. As a producer for the Austrian Film Museum's publication series he was involved in book releases on the Film Museum's Dziga Vertov Collection and on filmmaker James Benning. Notable publications include Film Curatorship: Archives, Museums and the Digital Marketplace (2008), co-authored with David Francis, Alexander Horwath and Paolo Cherchi Usai.

As a journalist, feature writer, commentator and editor he has contributed to numerous publications, books and articles on film history, curatorship and contemporary film culture. In addition he was a co-founder and editor of the German-language film periodical kolik.film and a critic for the Viennese weekly Falter.

He has been responsible for the production of several DVDs including the award-winning Entuziasm by Dziga Vertov (Edition Filmmuseum), and has collaborated with the celebrated film composer Michael Nyman.

As a curator he has been responsible for a number of large scale projects and exhibitions. In 2010 he curated the much-lauded Wien im Film at the Wien Museum in Vienna, a celebration of a century of images capturing the essence of the city. He also conceptualised and co-managed a series of digital humanities projects with the Ludwig Boltzmann Gesellschaft, including Film.Stadt.Wien , Ephemeral Films - National Socialism in Austria and Visual History of the Holocaust.

While in Australia he served as a member of the advisory board of the Centre for Media History at Macquarie University (Sydney) and the Wantok Music Foundation (Melbourne). As of 2022 he is a board member of the Austrian association of media archives  medien archive austria,

References

Living people
1974 births
Austrian chief executives
Writers from Vienna